This is a list of exonyms in the Cornish language.

Australia

Bangladesh

Belgium

Canada

Czech Republic

Denmark

England

France

Germany

Greece

India

Ireland

Isle of Man

Israel

Italy

Kuwait

Lebanon

Mexico

Netherlands

New Zealand

Norway

Papua New Guinea

Poland

Portugal

Russia

Saudi Arabia

Scotland

Spain

Switzerland

Syria

United States

Wales

Miscellaneous

International organisations

Oceans and seas

See also 
 List of European exonyms
 Welsh exonyms

References

Bibliography 
 

Lists of exonyms
Exonyms